Bárbara Gil (24 March 1930 – 11 September 2015) was a Mexican film and television actress.

Filmography

Films
The Lady of the Veil (1949) - Lolita - Laura Camarena
Quinto patio (1950) - Rosita
De Tequila, su mezcal (1950)
Tacos joven (1950)
Tierra baja (1951) - Nuri
La marquesa del barrio (1951) - María Cristina
La tienda de la esquina (1951) - Rosaura
Retorno al quinto patio (1951) - Rosa
Salón de baile (1952) - Gloria
The Right to Be Born (1952) - María Teresa
El luchador fenómeno (1952) - Martha
Marejada (1952) - Santuza
Acuérdate de vivir (1953) - Esther
Seven Women (1953)
El vendedor de muñecas (1955)
Ultraje al amor (1956) - Estela Soler
Escuela de rateros (1958) - Alicia
Ladrones de niños (1958) - Gloria
To Each His Life (1960) - Raquel, la 'Penas'
La sombra del Caudillo (1960) - Rosario
Una pasión me domina (1961) - Elena
Mi guitarra y mi caballo (1961)
Bonitas las tapatías (1961)
Jalisco Gals Are Beautiful (1961)
El fusilamiento (1962)
Our Hateful Husbands (1962)
La tigresa (1973) - Mamá de Luis
Las sobrinas del diablo (1983) - Doña Leonor
El mexicano feo (1984)
Los gatilleros del diablo (1985)
La muerte llora de risa (1985)
Golondrina presumida (1985)
La Alacrana (1986) - Dora, hermana de Elliseo
Sabor a mí (1988)
Señoritas a disgusto (1989) - Luisa
Esclavos de la pasión (1995)

Television
Senda prohibida (1958)
Un paso al abismo (1958)
El precio del cielo (1959)
No basta ser médico (1961)
Un hijo cayó del cielo (1961)
Marcela (1962)
La doctora (1964)
Central de emergencia (1964)
María Isabel (1966) - Mireya Serrano
Angustia del pasado (1967)
El profesor particular (1971)
Pobre Clara (1975) - Mary
Mi hermana la nena (1976) - María
Los años pasan (1985) - Ursula
El medio pelo (1980) - Paz
Pelusita (1980) - Rosa
Infamia (1981)
La pobre Señorita Limantour (1987)
Rosa Salvaje (1987 - 1988, 9 episodes, as Amalia)
Dos vidas (1988, as Doña Leonor)
Simplemente María (1989) - Dulce Martinez
Mujer, Casos de la Vida Real (1990-2004, 12 episodes) - Chayito / Juliana (final appearance)
Yo no creo en los hombres (1991) - Laura Miranda
La última esperanza (1993)
Mujer bonita (2001, 10 episodes) - Mariana
The Outsider (2001, 1 episode) - Sagrario Vargas

References

Bibliography
 Pitts, Michael R. Western Movies: A Guide to 5,105 Feature Films. McFarland, 2012.

External links

1930 births
2015 deaths
Mexican television actresses
Mexican film actresses
Mexican stage actresses
People from Guadalajara, Jalisco